George Washington Lane (1806 – November 12, 1863) was a United States district judge of the United States District Court for the Middle District of Alabama, the United States District Court for the Northern District of Alabama and the United States District Court for the Southern District of Alabama.

Education and career

Born in Cherokee County, Georgia, Lane moved to Limestone County, Alabama with his family in 1821 and read law with Judge Daniel Coleman in Athens, Alabama to enter the bar, and practiced there until 1829. He was a member of the Alabama House of Representatives from 1829 to 1833, a County Court Judge in Alabama beginning in 1832, and a Judge of the Alabama Circuit Court from 1834 to 1846. He was in private practice in Huntsville, Alabama from 1846 to 1861. Lane opposed the secession of Alabama from the United States.

Federal judicial service

Lane was nominated by President Abraham Lincoln on March 26, 1861, to a joint seat on the United States District Court for the Middle District of Alabama, the United States District Court for the Middle District of Alabama and the United States District Court for the Southern District of Alabama vacated by Judge William Giles Jones. He was confirmed by the United States Senate on March 28, 1861, and received his commission the same day. His service terminated on November 12, 1863, due to his death in Louisville, Kentucky. Lane was unable to hold court, as Alabama remained under Confederate control until well after Lane's death.

Family and character

Though Lane was a strong Unionist, his son, Captain Robert W. Lane, was killed in the Confederate service in Forrest's Cavalry Corps. Historian Willis Brewer wrote of Lane that, "as a judge he was lenient but sound and reliable, and as a man he was always popular because of his kind and humane nature".

References

Sources

External links
 Middle District of Alabama biography of George Washington Lane

1806 births
1863 deaths
People from Cherokee County, Georgia
Alabama state court judges
Members of the Alabama House of Representatives
Judges of the United States District Court for the Southern District of Alabama
Judges of the United States District Court for the Northern District of Alabama
Judges of the United States District Court for the Middle District of Alabama
United States federal judges appointed by Abraham Lincoln
19th-century American judges
People from Limestone County, Alabama
Politicians from Huntsville, Alabama
Southern Unionists in the American Civil War
United States federal judges admitted to the practice of law by reading law
Lawyers from Huntsville, Alabama
Date of birth unknown
19th-century American politicians